Juan Carlos Candisano (born 19 April 1966) is an Argentine equestrian. He competed in the individual eventing at the 1996 Summer Olympics.

References

External links
 

1966 births
Living people
Argentine male equestrians
Olympic equestrians of Argentina
Equestrians at the 1996 Summer Olympics
Place of birth missing (living people)